The 1980 United States Senate election in Colorado was held on November 4, 1980. Incumbent Democratic U.S. Senator Gary Hart won re-election to a second term.

Major candidates

Democratic 
 Gary Hart, incumbent U.S. Senator

Republican 
 Mary Estill Buchanan, Colorado Secretary of State
 Bo Callaway, former Secretary of the Army and former U.S. Representative from Georgia
 Sam H. Zakhem, Colorado State Senator

Results

See also 
 1980 United States Senate elections

References 

1980 Colorado elections
Colorado
1980